Maji (also Romanized as Majī; also known as Majīd) is a village in Farim Rural District, Dodangeh District, Sari County, Mazandaran Province, Iran. At the 2006 census, its population was 259, in 67 families.

References 

Populated places in Sari County